SPB TV  is a company developing technological solutions for OTT TV, IP TV and mobile TV.

One of the developments of SPB TV is an OTT TV platform for broadcasting TV and video content around the world, patented technologies for in-stream ad replacement, a set-top box for personalized viewing on a home screen. The company was founded in 2007. Its R&D headquarter is in St. Petersburg and it is a Skolkovo resident. SPB TV solutions are integrated by mobile operators and media companies.

SPB TV history and services
In 2006, a group of Russian IT specialists initiated the development of a media platform for mobile TV. The results of their activities made it possible to launch the SPB TV mobile television service in 2007. Since that time, SPB TV exists as an independent company that is engaged in the creation and development of its own technologies in the field of online broadcasting. The CEO of the company is Kirill Filippov.
From the beginning SPB TV video service was available worldwide. In 2016 a separate service SPB TV Russia was allocated. It is available only in the territory of the Russian Federation. With its appearance, the international version of SPB TV became known as SPB TV World.
The head office is located in Zug (Switzerland) and the research and development center is based in St. Petersburg (Russia). The SPB TV group of companies includes Skolkovo resident Pitersoftwarehaus.

Since 2013 the company has been a member of the Association of Communication Agencies of Russia (ACAR) and IAB Russia. In 2014, the company joined RUSSOFT and RAEC.

Projects

 2007  the emergence of the SPB TV service for delivering video and audio content to mobile devices. Launch of the Skylink operator's multimedia service.

 2009  SPB TV versions released for Windows Mobile, Symbian, Android and Blackberry platforms.

 2010  launch of a TV service for the Singaporean operator StarHub and a mobile video portal for Megafon telecom operator.

 2011  launch of the first operator's mobile service MTS TV, launch of the broadcast of the Copa America football championship for mTraffic. company. 

 2012  in partnership with DigiVive, the NexgTV mobile TV service was released. It was also adapted by several operators under their own brand White Label, BSNL, MTNL Mumbai и MTNL Delhi.

 2012  launch of a mobile video portal for Beeline company in Russia, the relay of radio stations for the Beeline service was launched.

 2013  launch of the AMEDIATEKA online cinema. The cinema belongs to the Amedia company. The content includes TV series HBO, Starz, ABC, BBC and other world-famous producers. Premieres, as a rule, take place in the service simultaneously with the rest of the world. 

 2014  launch of OTT service in Belarus for A1 operator (velcom).  

 2015  launch of an international service for the virtual mobile operator Lebara.
2015  launch of a mobile TV service for the Mobilink operator.

 2016  a new version of the SPB TV Rosing platform, named after the scientist Boris Rosing.

 2017  release of the first Russian TV set-top box based on Android TV, certified by Google in Russia. 

 2017  advertisement replacement for the First Channel's online air.

 2018  launch of the interactive television service Danzer TV.

 2019  launch of the first multi-screen OTT TV in Uzbekistan for the Beeline brand.

 2020  launch of E Terra Journal, a service for esports and gaming industry fans.

 2020  launch of an online market of Russian content for the Roskino company.

2021  launch of A1 video service for passengers of transport networks.

2021  SPB TV Media signed an agreement with NTRK on broadcasting of 12 Uzbek channels in the Russian Federation and the CIS.

Collaboration with Chinese media

Since 2013, SPB TV has been broadcasting Chinese content. Channels of Xinhua News Agency, CNC World Chinese and CNC English TV, were launched first. In 2015, Dragon TV International was added to the app. At the same time, a contract was signed between SPB TV and the CNTV Internet television (a subsidiary of the CCTV teleholding) for broadcasting of CCTV-4 (Chinese International), CCTV-9 Documentary, CCTV News, CCTV Français, CCTV Español, CCTV Russian and CCTV Arabian.

Localized versions of the children's animated series Luntik, Nick the Inventor and Magic Kitchen were licensed for broadcast in China with participation of SPB TV. 

On December 16, 2020, in Beijing, SPB TV was awarded the Golden Ribbon Special Contribution Award at the Belt and Road Media Community Forum. Belt and Road Media Community recognized the most active organizations that have provided assistance and support to partners in the fight against the COVID-19 epidemic with this award.

References

Television technology
Mobile software
Companies based in Zug
Multinational companies headquartered in Switzerland